Sauber may refer to:

 Sauber, Swiss Formula One team
 BMW Sauber, German Formula One team that competed from 2006 to 2009

People with the surname
 Peter Sauber (born 1943), Swiss racing driver and Formula One team principal and owner